Westfield is a village and civil parish in the Rother district of East Sussex. It is one of the largest villages in the area with a population of around 2,750. The village lies five miles (8 km) north of Hastings. It was known as Westewelle in the Domesday survey.

The parish includes the linear hamlet of Kent Street along the A21 road. This spans 800 yards from Carpenter's Barn Farm at the southern end past Claverton Country House Hotel up to Sedlescombe Golf Club at the northern end.

A prominent sight when entering the village from the south is the church dedicated to St. John the Baptist. Its many features include extensive buttressing, a 12th-century porch and a 14th-century font with an elaborate 17th-century cover. Above the door to the tower there is carved a Royal Coat of Arms with the list of vicars since 1250 set below. Looking towards the nave there is a Norman arch with squint windows to the side, cut through the 32 inches of stone. Another feature at the road entrance is the lychgate, with its four carved angels; this was added in 1887. The history of Westfield has been extensively researched by a resident of Westfield descended from a family who appear in the records from 1552. Westfield Football Club play in the Sussex County League Division Two.

Christmas festivities
Around the Christmas period, the residents of Westfield band together to raise money for the charity St Michael’s Hospice using the village’s popular Christmas lights display. Every year, the locals will go around with buckets collecting money from spectators viewing the lights to donate to the charity. As of Christmas 2017, the village have amassed a total of over £75,000 in donations to St Michael’s Hospice.

Amenities
Carr-Taylor Vineyards is situated nearby. There is still a village shop with Post Office, butchers and hairdressers. There is one pub currently The New Inn(previously called "The Old Courthouse". The village's second pub "The Plough" closed down in 2018.
Westfield School opened in 1877 and is a popular choice with parents within the surrounding areas.

Landmarks
The parish contains a Site of Special Scientific Interest—Maplehurst Wood. This is a  ancient woodland containing a range of flora and avian fauna. The village has significant areas of verge, which is purposely left wild in order to preserve nature - this is most notable on approach to the village on the A28, alongside Hole Farm. The woods mentioned is the only East Sussex site for Herb Paris (Paris quadrifolia).

Sport and leisure
Westfield has a Non-League football club Westfield (Sussex) F.C. who play at The Parish Field. There is a small recreation area with swings, etc. in the field opposite the church for the children of the parish. The countryside surrounding Westfield offers a good number of walking routes.  The village has two public houses, notably The New Inn and The Plough Inn. The local primary school has a hall attached to it, which can be used by the community. Many years ago Westfield was known for its witches and it is lost in antiquity about the East Sussex witch burnings.

References

External links

 Sussex OPC page for Westfield
 Westfield Horticultural Society
 Westfield's Christmas Lights

Villages in East Sussex
Civil parishes in East Sussex
Rother District